O'Sheehan, a Gaelic-Irish surname.

Overview

The O'Sheehan (or, as is the more common anglicization, Sheehan) family is an Irish clan traditionally of County Clare. Part of the Dalcassian branch of families, the O'Sheehans themselves played only a small role in Irish politics, as vassals to the more famed O'Briens, who commonly became kings of Thomond and included the Irish legend Brian Boru.

The original form of Sheehan is síocháin, meaning peace or peaceful. This in combination with the prefix O', meaning 'descendant of,' could be taken to mean something like 'descendant of peace,' or 'descendant of the peaceful one,' though who this could be referring to remains unclear.

Today, many Sheehans still live in County Clare, though others have since migrated to the United States and other countries, mainly as part of the mass exodus that followed the Great Famine.

Surnames
Irish families
Irish Brehon families
Surnames of Irish origin
Anglicised Irish-language surnames
Families of Irish ancestry
Roman Catholic families